Nagle Warren Mansion, also known as Cheyenne YWCA Building, is former residence and YWCA with three buildings located in Cheyenne, Laramie County, Wyoming. The mansion is on the edge of Cheyenne's historic downtown section on Cattle Barons’ Row. It operated as a bed and breakfast ("B&B") establishment since 1997 with twelve guest rooms decorated in Victorian West style.  One guest room is a suite and each room has its own bath. Six rooms are in the main house and six in the carriage house. There are three conference rooms. The B&B had an AAA four-diamond rating. Furnishings and decorations are authentic to the period of the American Old West and include furniture; wallpaper; brass, marble, bronze, or gas fireplaces; ornate staircases; cherry, mahogany, and oak woodwork; and stained glass windows, as well as some Moorish tile and a Moroccan chandelier.  In 2019 it became a private residence.

The mansion was built as a residence in 1888 by Erasmus Nagle. Nagle died in 1890 and his wife Emma and son George lived there until 1907. Emma then rented the mansion to General George Randall from 1907 until 1910. Senator and former Wyoming Governor Francis E. Warren and his second wife, Clara LaBarron Morgan, bought the house in April 1910, and their dining room received such guests as Presidents Theodore Roosevelt and William Howard Taft.  The Senator died in 1929, and Clara gave the mansion to the YWCA.

The house and its dependencies compose one of the few residences from the 1800s left standing in Cheyenne.  In 1960 the outer stone, which had been predicted back in 1880 to be too soft, began to crumble and the exterior was covered in stucco.  Don and Barbara Sullivan began living there with their children in 1985, when they bought the residence.  Jim Osterfoss bought it in 1997, restored it, and turned it into the B&B that it now is.

The stone carriage house, originally a stable for four horses, was later used as an automobile garage and during the YWCA years as an entertainment center.  The original stone smokehouse also still stands, making a total of three buildings on the property, though the carriage and main houses are now connected.  The residence was added to the National Register of Historic Places on July 12, 1976.

See also
 National Register of Historic Places listings in Laramie County, Wyoming

References

External links

Houses on the National Register of Historic Places in Wyoming
Houses in Cheyenne, Wyoming
National Register of Historic Places in Cheyenne, Wyoming